was a town located in Iwata District, Shizuoka Prefecture, Japan. Toyoda was founded in 1973.

As of March 1, 2005, the town had an estimated population of 29,591 and a density of 1,493 persons per km². The total area was 19.82 km². The town was served by Toyoda Station on the Tōkaidō Main Line railway.

On April 1, 2005, Toyoda, along with the towns of Fukude and Ryūyō, and the village of Toyooka (all from Iwata District), was merged into the expanded city of Iwata and thus no longer exists as an independent municipality.

External links
 Iwata official website 

Dissolved municipalities of Shizuoka Prefecture
Iwata, Shizuoka